Live at Woodstock is a live album released on August 2, 2019 via Fantasy Records. The set documents swamp rock band Creedence Clearwater Revival's set at the Woodstock music festival on August 17, 1969. The release has received positive reviews and mild chart success.

Recording and release
Creedence Clearwater Revival was the first act to sign a contract for August's Woodstock festival in April 1969, for $10,000 (equivalent to $ today). Given their late start time and omission from the Woodstock film (at John Fogerty's insistence), Creedence members have expressed bitterness over their experiences regarding the festival.

In 1994, "Commotion", "Green River", "Ninety Nine and a Half (Won't Do)", and "I Put a Spell on You" appeared on Woodstock: Three Days of Peace and Music and for the 40th anniversary home video release of the film, the band allowed the inclusion of "Born on the Bayou", "I've Put a Spell On You", and "Keep On Chooglin". This album also coincides with a 38-disc box set from Rhino Records compiling the entire festival, Woodstock – Back to the Garden: The Definitive 50th Anniversary Archive.

Critical reception

On AllMusic, Stephen Thomas Erlewine said, "Throughout their hour-long set, CCR sound ferocious, tearing through their hardest material... The hardness of their choogle is a bit of a revelation, as the band sound fiery in a way that they don't on any of the officially released Creedence live recordings."

In American Songwriter, Hal Horowitz wrote, "The foursome cranks out their songs with requisite energy... But it's the closing cover of Ray Charles' "Night Time Is the Right Time", plus "Keep on Chooglin'" and "Susie Q", the latter two over ten minutes long, where the sparks really fly... The remastered audio captures each instrument with surprisingly sharp and clean separation."

In Classic Rock, Fraser Lewry said, "The recording is great, Fogerty's in fine voice throughout, the hits keep coming, and when the band slip into those chugging grooves they're emphatically fierce. "I Put a Spell on You" is even more ominous than the recorded version, and the 20 minutes given over to "Keep On Chooglin'" and "Suzie Q" as the set climaxes are flat-out intense."

In The Spill Magazine, Gerrod Harris wrote, "The band's cover of Screamin' Jay Hawkins' 1956 hit, "I Put a Spell on You" is a definite showstopper. With its haunting melody, rhythms, and chord progressions, Fogerty makes the track his own with a flawless performance that is topped only by his jaw–dropping guitar solo... It comes as no surprise that Live at Woodstock is a stellar live album."

In the Chicago Tribune, Greg Kot said, "Contrary to Fogerty's original take on the performance, it's a blazing document of the band at its peak and should've helped cement the band's legacy... 'The performances are classic CCR,' bassist Cook later told band biographer Hank Bordowitz, 'and I'm still amazed by the number of people who don't even know we were one of the headliners.'"

Track listing
All songs written by John Fogerty, except where noted
"Born on the Bayou" – 5:34
"Green River" – 3:16
"Ninety-Nine and a Half (Won’t Do)" (Steve Cropper, Wilson Pickett) – 4:46
"Bootleg" – 3:38
"Commotion" – 2:48
"Bad Moon Rising" – 2:13
"Proud Mary" – 3:52
"I Put a Spell on You" (Jay Hawkins, Herb Slotkin) – 4:28
"The Night Time Is the Right Time" (Nappy Brown, Ozzie Cadena, Lew Herman) – 3:30
"Keep on Chooglin’" – 10:29
"Suzie Q" (Dale Hawkins, Robert Chaisson, Stan Lewis, and Eleanor Broadwater) – 10:52

Personnel
Creedence Clearwater Revival
John Fogerty – vocals, guitar, harmonica, piano
Tom Fogerty – rhythm guitar, backing vocals, co-lead vocals on "Suzie Q"
Stu Cook – bass guitar
Doug Clifford – drums

Production
Mason Williams – album release producer
Andy Zax – audio production
Brian Kehew – audio production, mixing
Dave Schultz – mastering
Edwin Kramer – location recording engineer
Lee Osborne – location recording engineer
Hanley Sound, Inc. – original 8-track recordings
Henry Diltz – photography
Tommy Steele – design
Ryan Jebavy – editorial

Charts

References

External links

2019 live albums
Creedence Clearwater Revival live albums
Fantasy Records live albums
Woodstock Festival
Craft Recordings live albums